Charles Inder (born 2 July 1914, date of death unknown) was an English cricketer. He played first-class cricket for Bengal and Europeans.

See also
 List of Bengal cricketers

References

External links
 

1914 births
Year of death missing
English cricketers
Bengal cricketers
Europeans cricketers
People from Hornsey